The canton of Pamiers-2 is an administrative division of the Ariège department, southern France. It was created at the French canton reorganisation which came into effect in March 2015. Its seat is in Pamiers.

It consists of the following communes:
 
Arvigna
Le Carlaret
Les Issards
Ludiès
Pamiers (partly)
Les Pujols
Saint-Amadou
La Tour-du-Crieu

References

Cantons of Ariège (department)